Rees Richards (1886 – death unknown) was a Welsh dual-code international rugby union, and professional rugby league footballer who played in the 1910s. He played representative level rugby union (RU) for Wales, and at club level for Aberavon RFC, as a forward, and representative level rugby league (RL) for Wales, and at club level for Wigan, as a forward (prior to the specialist positions of), during the era of contested scrums.

Background
Rees Richards was born in Cwmafan, Wales.

International honours
Richards won caps for Wales (RU) while at Aberavon RFC in 1913 against Scotland, France, and Ireland, and won a cap for Wales (RL) while at Wigan in 1914.

References

External links
Statistics at wigan.rlfans.com

1886 births
Aberavon RFC players
Dual-code rugby internationals
Place of birth missing
Place of death missing
Rugby league forwards
Rugby league players from Neath Port Talbot
Rugby union forwards
Rugby union players from Cwmavon, Neath Port Talbot
Wales international rugby union players
Wales national rugby league team players
Welsh rugby league players
Welsh rugby union players
Wigan Warriors players
Year of death missing